Lambda Ursae Minoris (λ UMi, λ Ursae Minoris) is a star in the constellation Ursa Minor.  It is an M-type red giant with an apparent magnitude of +6.38 and is approximately 880 light years from Earth.

Lambda Ursae Minoris is an asymptotic giant branch (AGB) star, a star that has exhausted its core hydrogen and helium and is now fusing material in shells outside its core.  AGB stars are often unstable and tend to pulsate, and Lambda Ursae Minoris is classified as a semiregular variable star and its brightness varies by about 0.1 magnitudes.  Its variability was discovered from Hipparcos astrometry and it was entered into the General Catalogue of Variable Stars in 1999.

This star was used from 1882 as a reference to measure the magnitudes of stars in the northern hemisphere for the 1908 Revised Harvard Photometry catalogue. Sigma Octantis was used for the southern hemisphere. It was then noted that "Neither of these stars appears to vary perceptibly" but that, due to the procedures used "if they did, the variation would have no effect on the final measures."

References

External links 
 
 LAMBDA UMI (Lambda Ursae Minoris) – Jim Kaler

Ursae Minoris, Lambda
Ursa Minor (constellation)
M-type giants
Semiregular variable stars
7394
183030
BD+88 0112
084535